Gäufelden is a municipality in the administrative district of Böblingen, in the German state of Baden-Württemberg.

Geography
Gäufelden is located in the upper Gäu about seven kilometres from Herrenberg and just as far from Nagold. The local subdistrict extends from 390 to 545 metres above sea level.

Economy and Infrastructure

Traffic

Rail
Gäufelden is connected to the national railway network via the Stuttgart–Horb railway. The railway station is served every two hours by regional express trains to Singen (in the opposite direction to Stuttgart Hauptbahnhof), by regional trains to Freudenstadt Hauptbahnhof or Rottweil, which also share every two hours in Eutingen im Gäu, and by individual regional trains to Herrenberg (in the opposite direction to Bondorf (b Herrenberg)). In the evenings from Monday to Friday, a pair of trains on the  line of the Karlsruhe Stadtbahn, which otherwise ends in Eutingen im Gäu, will also be tied through to Herrenberg, which also stops in Gäufelden.

Bus transport
In order to provide a connection to the  line of the Stuttgart S-Bahn to Kirchheim unter Teck, which terminates in Herrenberg, Gäufelden is served hourly by buses in the direction of Herrenberg.

Roads
Gäufelden is located on several Landesstraßen and Kreisstraßen.

History
The municipality was founded July 1, 1971 by the voluntary merger of the previously independent villages of  Nebringen, Öschelbronn and Tailfingen.
Since then, the population has more than doubled. These three villages constitute "Ortsteile" (districts) of Gäufelden. Each district retains a Rathaus (town hall), but the administration is centralized in Öschelbronn.

Former mayors
 Herrmann Wolf (1971-2003)
 Johannes Buchter (2003-2019)

References

External links
  
 Public Library of Gäufelden (in German)

Böblingen (district)